George Ray may refer to:

 George Augustus Ray (1819–1893), Wisconsin State Assemblyman
 George H. Ray (1847–1910), Speaker of the Wisconsin State Assembly
 George W. Ray (1844–1925), United States Representative from New York
 George R. Ray (1869–1935), politician in Manitoba, Canada
 George Ray (footballer, born 1993), English-born Welsh footballer
 George Ray (1920s footballer), English footballer

See also